Season 3 of Norske Talenter premiered on March 5, 2010 with auditions. They auditioned in Bergen, Oslo and Trondheim, and picked out 40 semifinalists.

Judges
Alex Rosén
Mia Gundersen
Thomas Giertsen

Hosts

 John Brungot

Marthe Sveberg

Semifinals

Semifinal 1

Semifinal 2

Semifinal 3

Semifinal 4

Final

2010 Norwegian television seasons
Norske Talenter